The Anzac Day match is an annual Australian rules football match between Collingwood and Essendon, two clubs in the Australian Football League, held on Anzac Day (25 April) at the Melbourne Cricket Ground (MCG).

History of Australian rules football on Anzac Day

During many wars, Australian rules football matches have been played overseas in places like northern Africa and Vietnam as a celebration of Australian culture and as a bonding exercise between soldiers. Despite this, League football was not played on Anzac Day for many years; in 1959, for example, when all VFL games were played on Saturday afternoons, Anzac Day also fell on a Saturday, and the entire round was postponed to the following Saturday. The first VFL matches played on Anzac Day occurred in 1960 after an Act of Parliament which lifted the previous restrictions on this activity.

The Anzac Day Act required a donation of a portion of ticket sales to the RSL, so the RSL was active in encouraging the VFL to play on the day. The VFL was initially unenthusiastic, and on Anzac Day Tuesday in 1961 it scheduled smaller games at Windy Hill and Punt Road Oval for the day. The Victorian Football Association attempted to capitalise on this, and with the RSL's support it moved a marquee match between rivals Sandringham and Moorabbin to the Melbourne Cricket Ground and put on a pre-match spectacle on a similar scale to that of the AFL's modern Anzac Day clash. The crowd of just under 14,000 was similar in size to the VFA's largest Sunday crowds at the time, but it still fell well short of the VFA's pre-match expectations; nevertheless, the match was a pioneer in the treatment of football on Anzac Day as a special occasion.

In 1962 and 1967, instead of playing premiership matches on Anzac Day, the VFL arranged a representative match for Anzac Day between the Victorian team from the previous year's Interstate Carnival and a team representing the rest of the league. Both matches drew small crowds between 15,000 and 20,000.

Eventually, the VFL did begin to play matches on Anzac Day. These games sometimes drew huge crowds. The 1975 –Essendon game attracted 77,770 fans to VFL Park, an Anzac Day record at the time; two years later, in 1977,  and Collingwood drew 92,436 to the MCG.

In 1986, the league used Anzac Day to attempt its first ever single-venue doubleheader. Due to a total crowd of only 40,117 and various logistical problems, the League would not stage another single-venue doubleheader at any venue again until 2020.

Through the years until the mid-1990s, it was common for at least two matches to be played on the Anzac Day public holiday.

History of Anzac Day match
The modern version of the Anzac Day match was conceived by then Essendon coach Kevin Sheedy while pottering in his garden in the mid-1990s. Sheedy, who had served two years in the army after being drafted to Richmond in 1969, thought back to the success of the Collingwood–Richmond game in 1977, and he considered how football on Anzac Day could pay suitable tribute to those who had served their country. Sheedy organised a meeting with officials from Essendon and Collingwood—as well as the then Victorian RSL President Bruce Ruxton, who was also a keen Collingwood supporter—and proposed his concept for a game which would honour the Anzac spirit. Despite their previous opposition to football on Anzac Day, Ruxton and the RSL agreed with Sheedy's proposal, as did the AFL.

The first modern Anzac Day match between Collingwood and Essendon was played on Tuesday, 25 April 1995 at the MCG. The Round 4 match received limited publicity, as there had previously been AFL matches played on 25 April. Essendon had won its first three games of the season; however, Collingwood were without a victory at that point in the season. Soon after the Anzac Day march in the city, patrons flocked to the ground. Crowds outside the ground were so substantial at 12.30pm that Collingwood coach Leigh Matthews thought the gates to the ground must have still been locked. When the gates were closed at 1.30 pm—still 40 minutes before the start of the match—20,000 additional people had to be dispersed by mounted police while would-be gatecrashers attempted to gain admission into the stadium. Thousands of these people descended on nearby Fitzroy Gardens, where they listened to the match on radio.

Played on a sunny autumn day, both teams kicked six goals in the first quarter. A three-goal-to-one second quarter helped Essendon lead by 16 points at half time. However, the momentum swayed in the third quarter, when Collingwood kicked seven goals to two, giving them a 14-point lead at the break. Essendon started strongly in the final term, and when James Hird snapped a goal late in the quarter, he gave his team a six-point advantage. Saverio "Sav" Rocca leapt and took "one of the marks of the year" in the forward line soon after. At the 28-minute mark, he capitalised by kicking the goal and levelling the scores. With just seconds left, Nathan Buckley had an opportunity to score; however, he elected to kick to Rocca, who was cut off. Seconds later, the siren sounded; both teams' scores were 111. Roars from the 94,825-strong crowd during the match could easily be heard from a kilometre away, and the crowd remains the second-highest home-and-away crowd in VFL/AFL history, surpassed only by the 99,346 who attended the Collingwood–Melbourne Queen's/King's Birthday clash in 1958.

Today, this game is often considered the biggest match of the AFL season outside of the finals, sometimes drawing bigger crowds than all but the Grand Final, and often selling out in advance. As a point of comparison, in the National Rugby League, the Sydney Roosters and St. George Illawarra Dragons have played on Anzac Day since 2002, but generally without the increase in crowd numbers compared to other games as seen in the AFL. However, Anzac Day matches have been a regular part of the rugby league season for over 80 years.

The Seven Network held broadcasting rights to the Collingwood–Essendon match from its inception in 1995 until 2001. Following this, the Nine Network (2002–06) and Network Ten (2007–09, and 2011) had the broadcasting rights, with the Seven Network broadcasting it in 2010. From the 2012 season onwards, the Seven Network regained the broadcasting rights to the match.

In recent years, other clubs and some sections of the media have lobbied for the game to be shared amongst all clubs, not just Collingwood and Essendon. Since 1996, one year after the team's inception, Fremantle has held the Len Hall Tribute Game, named in honour of Western Australia's last Gallipoli veteran. This game is regularly held on Anzac Day as a Western Australian featured game. With Anzac Day falling on a Saturday in 2009, four games were scheduled for the day, yet the largest fixture (the MCG) continued to host Collingwood and Essendon at the exclusion of other clubs. Critics have argued that this venue fixture should be shared.

Meaning and significance
For many people, the clash may be their closest involvement with Anzac Day remembrance services. Before the match, a special Anzac Day service is held at the MCG. This ceremony includes the recognition of Australian War Veterans as well as a Flag Ceremony, including the playing of the "Last Post" and "Australian National Anthem".

Sydney-based journalist and former Australian rugby national representative player Peter FitzSimons commented in the Sydney Morning Herald of the 2008 game that he had:...rarely seen something so impressive in the world of sport. As they played the Last Post and the national anthem, the 100,000-strong crowd uttered not a peep, whispered not a murmur. The atmosphere was electric and the general mood in the air one of reverence for the diggers and anticipation of the game to come...Somewhere, someone has done a superb job organising that landmark day in Australian sport.

The Collingwood Football Club asserts:
The Anzac Day blockbuster between Collingwood and Essendon has become one of our biggest national sporting events ... The Anzac Day match pays tribute to the sacrifice of the servicemen and women of Australia and celebrates the Anzac spirit – courage, sacrifice, endurance and mateship.

Collingwood's former president Eddie McGuire has stated that "veterans will see the reason why they fought so hard for the Australian culture with two great tribes going at each other".

Conversely, some commentators such as Francis Leach, Liz Porter, Chris Fotinopoulos and Ruby Murray have criticised the Australian Football League for the way it promotes the event, arguing that it has exploited the sacredness and solemnity of the Anzac story for the purpose of financial profit. According to Porter:

The commodification of "the Anzac spirit" as an AFL marketing device appears to have begun with the 1995 Essendon-Collingwood clash, after which a commemorative poster of the game was produced, bearing the words "Lest we forget". A solemn pledge was reborn as an advertising slogan.

Also the subject of criticism have been the comments often made in relation to the game by the AFL, sports journalists, media personalities, club officials, coaches and some sections of the media which conflate the Anzac spirit at Gallipoli with the fighting spirit on the football ground. In the opinion of Fotinopoulos, "the real meaning of Anzac Day has become distorted by slick marketing campaigns designed to pass footballers off as war heroes." These criticisms were highlighted in 2009 when Collingwood coach Mick Malthouse stated that his team had "let the Anzacs down" in losing the game, and that "Essendon showed true Anzac spirit, the reason why we play here." Journalist Patrick Smith responded in The Australian that this comparison between the game of football and the sadness and bravery of war "belittles and trivialises the suffering of the men and women which Anzac Day is set aside to remember and thank." In a subsequent article, Smith argued:

The AFL itself is in danger of manipulating Anzac Day. The commission is looking to play more games than the traditional Essendon-Collingwood match which had previously been set aside as the code's mark of respect. To play more matches around the country is to move uneasily close to a ratings and money-making tool. Given that bravery and commitment in war is acknowledged with medals, the AFL seeks to capitalise on that with awarding the Anzac Medal to the best player on Anzac Day. On reflection, that is bordering on tacky.

The trophy awarded to the winning team each year has etched on it the names of football players who died during war, images of soldiers from the Australian Infantry Forces and the words "Lest We Forget". Furthermore, the cup is made from glass, silver and bronze on a base of ironbark that comes from an ammunition wagon used in service at Villers-Bretonneux during the First World War, whilst the bronze columns supporting the silver bowl incorporate metal salvaged from the Gallipoli battlefields.

Anzac Medal

A best-on-ground player has been named for each of the Anzac Day clashes. Since 2000, the player in the match considered to best exemplify the Anzac spirit—skill, courage, self-sacrifice, teamwork and fair play—has been awarded the AFL Anzac Medal. This medal has been won three times by Collingwood champion and current captain Scott Pendlebury and retired Essendon star (and former Essendon coach) James Hird. In 2001, Collingwood's Chris Tarrant became the first—and so far only—player to have won the medal despite playing in the losing team.

Before the start of the 2011 Anzac Day match, the AFL presented retrospective Anzac Medals to their intended recipients for all of the matches prior to the introduction of the medal in 2000.

Match results

* Retrospective medals awarded in 2011, for games from 1995 to 1999, as the first official Anzac Medal was awarded in 2000.

^ Capacity of ground reduced due to redevelopment for the Melbourne 2006 Commonwealth Games.

^^ Capacity of ground reduced due to the COVID-19 pandemic.

Other ANZAC Day fixtures

ANZAC Day eve 
Melbourne vs. Richmond (2015–present)

On 30 October 2014, the AFL confirmed that Richmond and Melbourne would host an Anzac Day eve night clash at the MCG starting from the 2015 season.

As part of the pre-match ceremonies, a torch lit from the Eternal Flame at the Shrine of Remembrance is carried to the ground, where it lights a cauldron on an MCG stage to burn for the duration of the match. Players from both sides, including coaches and officials, alongside returned servicemen and women, line up near the flame for the playing of the "Last Post" and "Advance Australia Fair". The pre-match ceremony was developed by—and has the full support of—the RSL, the Shrine of Remembrance, and the Australian Defence Force. Ron Barassi, whose father died at Tobruk during World War II in 1941, was the first person to light the cauldron. In 2017, the Anzac eve match drew a crowd of 85,657, the highest ever between the two clubs, ensuring the fixture was continued the following year.

Until 2020, there was no official trophy for the winning team or player's medal for best on ground. Since 2021, the Frank 'Checker' Hughes medal will be awarded for the player judged best afield.

|- style=";background:#ccf"
| Edition
| Year
| Date
| 
| Home Team
| 
| Away Team
| 
| Ground
| Crowd
| Winner
|
|
|
| Best on ground1
| Club 
| Report
|- style="background:#fff;"
| 1
| style="text-align: center;"|2015
| 24/4
| 4
| Richmond
| 6.15 (51)
|style="background:#ccffcc;"| Melbourne
| style="background:#ccffcc;"|12.11 (83)
| MCG
| 58,175
|bgcolor="#061A33" div style="text-align: center;"|
!32
!L
|bgcolor="#061A33" div style="text-align: center;"|
| Nathan Jones
|
| 
|- style="background:#fff;"
| 2
| style="text-align: center;"|2016
| 24/4
| 5
|style="background:#ccffcc;"| Melbourne
| style="background:#ccffcc;"|20.9 (129)
| Richmond
| 14.12 (96)
| MCG
| 59,968
|bgcolor="#061A33" div style="text-align: center;"|
!33
!W
|bgcolor="#061A33" div style="text-align: center;"|
| Max Gawn
|
| 
|- style="background:#fff;"
| 3
| style="text-align: center;"|2017
|24/4
|5
|style="background:#ccffcc;"| Richmond
| style="background:#ccffcc;"| 12.16 (88)
| Melbourne
| 11.9 (75)
| MCG
| 85,657
|bgcolor="Black" div style="text-align: center;"|
!13
!W
|bgcolor="#061A33" div style="text-align: center;"|
| Jack Riewoldt
|
| 
|- style="background:#fff;"
| 4
| style="text-align: center;"|2018
|24/4
|5
|Melbourne
|8.8 (56)
|style="background:#ccffcc;"| Richmond
|style="background:#ccffcc;"| 15.12 (102)
|MCG
|77,071
|bgcolor="Black" div style="text-align: center;"|
!46
!W
|div style="text-align: center;"|0
| Kane Lambert
|
| 
|- style="background:#fff;"
| 5
| style="text-align: center;"|2019
|24/4
|6
|style="background:#ccffcc;"|Richmond
|style="background:#ccffcc;"|12.13 (85)
|Melbourne
|6.6 (42)
|MCG
|72,704
|bgcolor="Black" div style="text-align: center;"|
!43
!W
|bgcolor="Black" div style="text-align: center;"|
| Nick Vlastuin
|
| 
|-
|
| style="text-align: center;"|2020
| colspan=15| No match played in 2020 due to the COVID-19 pandemic
|- style="background:#fff;"
| 6
| style="text-align: center;"|2021
| 24/4
| 6
|style="background:#ccffcc;"| Melbourne
| style="background:#ccffcc;"|12.10 (82)
| Richmond
| 6.12 (48)
| MCG
| 56,418
|bgcolor="#061A33" div style="text-align: center;"|
!34
!W
|div style="text-align: center;"|0
| Christian Petracca
|2
| 
|- style="background:#fff;"
| 7
| style="text-align: center;"|2022
| 24/4
| 6
| Richmond
| 8.6 (54)
|style="background:#ccffcc;"| Melbourne
| style="background:#ccffcc;"|9.22 (76)
| MCG
| 70,334
|bgcolor="#061A33" div style="text-align: center;"|
!22
!W
|bgcolor="#061A33" div style="text-align: center;"|
| Clayton Oliver
|
| 

1 2015–2019: three Brownlow votes, 2021–present: Frank 'Checker' Hughes Medal
2 Player also received three Brownlow votes

New Zealand match 
St Kilda vs. various clubs (2013–2015)

The New Zealand ANZAC Day matches were held to commemorate the centenary of the forming of the ANZACs in 1913 through to the centenary of the Gallipoli landings in 1915.
In 2013,  and Sydney played an Anzac Day match in New Zealand in remembrance of the centenary of the forming of the ANZACs in 1913. This was the first AFL game ever played for premiership points outside Australia. Sydney won the game by 16 points, scoring 11.13 (79) to St Kilda 9.9 (63), while the first New Zealand–awarded Anzac Medal went to Sydney's Dan Hannebery. Before the game St Kilda captain Nick Riewoldt said "To play on Anzac Day in another country for the first time in the history of the sport is a momentous occasion and as a playing group we feel really privileged to be doing that...".
 
The game was attended by the Prime Minister of New Zealand, John Key; Australian Minister for Sport, Kate Lundy; and the AFL chief executive, Andrew Demetriou. Key reflected on the significance of the Anzac relationship, commenting shortly before the game began on Australia's immediate assistance following the Christchurch earthquake, and saying "The Anzac spirit is as alive today as it was in 1915". Key also used the occasion to raise the prospect of a New Zealand–based AFL team, saying at the official pre-match function "Let's get real. We've got to get a New Zealand side in the AFL.". While Demetriou would not comment further on Key's statements, he said he planned to chat to Key about it at a later date, and stated New Zealand was "unquestionably our fastest growth market outside Australia".

The winning club received the "Simpson–Henderson Trophy", named in honour of Australian John Simpson Kirkpatrick and New Zealander Richard Alexander Henderson, both known for carrying wounded soldiers from World War I battlefields on donkeys. However, the fixture was subsequently scrapped.

|- style=";background:#ccf;" 
| 
| Year
| Date
| 
| Home Team
| 
| Away Team
| 
| Ground
| Crowd
| Winner
|
|
|
| Brownlow Votes
| ANZAC Medallist
|- style="background:#fff;"
| 1
| style="text-align: center;"|2013
| 25/4
| 5
| St Kilda 
| 9.9 (63)
|style="background:#ccffcc;"|Sydney
| style="background:#ccffcc;"|11.13 (79)
| Wellington Regional Stadium
| 22,546
|bgcolor="White" div style="text-align: center;"|
!16
!W
|bgcolor="White" div style="text-align: center;"|
| 3. T.Richards – (SYD)2. D.Hannebery – (SYD)1. K.Jack – (SYD)
| Dan Hannebery – (SYD)
|- style="background:#fff;"
| 2
| style="text-align: center;"|2014
| 25/4
| 6
| St Kilda 
| 11.13 (79)
|style="background:#ccffcc;"|Brisbane
| style="background:#ccffcc;"|12.10 (82)
| Wellington Regional Stadium
| 13,409
|bgcolor="#78184A" div style="text-align: center;"|
!3
!L
|bgcolor="#78184A" div style="text-align: center;"|
| 3. L.Montagna – (StK)2. J.Redden – (BL)1. L.Hayes – (StK)
| Leigh Montagna – (StK) 
|- style="background:#fff;"
| 3
| style="text-align: center;"|2015
|25/4
|4
| St Kilda 
| 12.9 (81) 
|style="background:#ccffcc;"|Carlton
| style="background:#ccffcc;"|18.13 (121)
| Wellington Regional Stadium
| 12,125 
|bgcolor="Navy" div style="text-align: center;"|
!40
!L
|bgcolor="Navy" div style="text-align: center;"|
| 3. M.Murphy – (CAR)2. Z.Tuohy – (CAR)1. L.Henderson – (CAR) 
| Marc Murphy – (CAR)

Len Hall Tribute game 
Fremantle vs. various clubs (1996–)

The Len Hall game is named in tribute to the last Gallipoli veteran from Western Australia, Len Hall (1887–1999). Matches are either played on ANZAC Day itself or over that weekend during the same round.

* There was no match played in 2001 and 2002 because Fremantle played away in the Anzac Round in both of those years.^ Match played without crowd attendance, due to COVID-19 restrictions.''

References

Australian Football League games
Australian Football League awards
Australian Football League rivalries
Collingwood Football Club
Essendon Football Club
Sports competitions in Melbourne
1995 establishments in Australia
ANZAC (Australia)